Lafarge Lake–Douglas is a rapid transit station on the Millennium Line, part of Metro Vancouver's SkyTrain system, which serves as the line's outbound terminus. It is located in Coquitlam, British Columbia, Canada and opened for service on December 2, 2016, along with the rest of the Evergreen Extension.

The station features 4 bus passenger pickup/drop-off bays along Pinetree Way, a dedicated HandyDART area, night bus service, bike lockers/racks, and 150 City of Coquitlam-managed "Park and Ride" parking spaces.

Location

Nearby amenities include the BMX bike park, City Centre Aquatic Complex, Coquitlam City Hall, Coquitlam RCMP and Fire Department, Coquitlam Town Centre, Douglas College (David Lam campus), Evergreen Cultural Centre, Lafarge Lake, Percy Perry Stadium, Pinetree Secondary School, Town Centre Park, and Tri-Cities Chamber of Commerce.

Station information

Station layout

Entrances
Lafarge Lake–Douglas station is served by a single entrance facing south, located at the northeast corner of the intersection of Guildford Way and Pinetree Way.

Transit connections

Lafarge–Lake Douglas station provides connections to several Tri-Cities bus routes. Bus bay assignments are as follows:

Another stop is located southbound at Pinetree Way at Guildford Way.

References

External links
Lafarge Lake–Douglas Station

Millennium Line stations
Railway stations in Canada opened in 2016
Evergreen Extension stations
Buildings and structures in Coquitlam
2016 establishments in British Columbia